The Magic Summer Tour was the second major concert tour by American boy band, the New Kids on the Block. The tour supported their fourth studio album, Step by Step (1990) and their first compilation album, No More Games (The Remix Album) (1990).

The tour began only one month after their previous concluded. After the summer leg ended, the tour shifted gears and was renamed the "No More Games Tour", following the announcement of their remix album. Lasting 22 months, the group played over 220 concerts in Europe, North America, Asia, and Australasia.

Background
The 1990 summer tour was sponsored by Coca-Cola and tied into its "Magic Summer '90" campaign that included the infamous MagiCan.

The tour was a commercial success. Both stints in North America landed the group in the top 10 tours in 1990 and 1991. In 1990, the group earned $74.1 million from 152 shows in North America (25 of which were performed during their previous tour).

During an encore performance of "Hangin' Tough" at the end of the second concert held at Saratoga Springs on June 25, Donnie Wahlberg fell through a trap door while jumping off a raised platform. He received scrapes and bruises to his chest, neck, and arms. After being hospitalized for a night, he spent a week recuperating, and the rest of the band continued the next few concerts as a four-piece act.

Opening acts
Perfect Gentlemen 
Rick Wes 
Tommy Page 
Biscuit 
Brenda K. Starr 
George Lamond 
The Good Girls

Setlist
"Call It What You Want"
"My Favorite Girl"
"Valentine Girl"
"Didn't I (Blow Your Mind This Time)" (Europe and North America's first leg only)
"You Got It (The Right Stuff)"
"Baby, I Believe in You"
"Cover Girl"
"Let's Try It Again"
"Stay With Me Baby"
Medley:
"I Remember When"
"Angel"
"Please Don't Go Girl"
"Where Do I Go from Here?"
"Treat Me Right"
"Never Gonna Fall in Love Again"
"Funny Feeling"
"I'll Be Loving You (Forever)"
"Games"
"Tonight"
"Step By Step"
"This One's for the Children"
"Hangin' Tough"

Notes: 

• Didn't I (Blow Your Mind This Time) was performed as the third song in the setlist instead of Valentine Girl during the 1990 European dates of the tour 

•   “Funny Feeling” was occasionally taken out of the setlist for unknown reasons and "I'll Be Loving You (Forever) was performed instead.

• There were shows where the spot in the set list that held both   “Funny Feeling” or  "I'll Be Loving You (Forever) (depending on the show) were taken off the set list completely and “ Games" would be performed right after "Never Gonna Fall in Love Again". 

• At select shows in Japan, a rendition of the Jackson 5 song "I'll Be There" was performed during the set list

Tour dates
Magic Summer Tour

No More Games Tour

Box office score data

See also 
 List of highest-grossing concert tours

References

New Kids on the Block concert tours
1990 concert tours
1991 concert tours
1992 concert tours